The discography of Australian indie pop band Sheppard consists of three studio albums, five extended plays, thirty three singles (including two as a featured artist) and twenty-eight music videos.

Studio albums

Extended plays

Singles

As lead artist

As featured artist

Music videos

Notes

References

External links
 

Discographies of Australian artists
Pop music group discographies